Rabah Belamri (11 October 1946 – 28 September 1995) was an Algerian writer.

Biography 
Rabah Belamri lost his sight in 1962.
 
He obtained French nationality.

He is the author of several collections of poems, tales and novels inspired by his Algerian childhood. He was touched by the work of Jean Sénac to whom he devoted an essay and who he considered a guide.

He died on September 28 in 1995 in Paris following a surgery, leaving his work unfinished.

Citation

Judgements

Bibliography

Works 
1980: L'œuvre de Louis Bertrand, miroir de l'idéologie colonialiste, Office des Publications Universitaires, Algiers
1982: Les Graines de la douleur, Algerian folk tales, Publisud, Paris, 110 p. .
1982: La Rose rouge, Algerian folk tales, Publisud
1983: Chemin de brûlure, poems, drawings by Hamid Tibouchi, Paris
1986: L'Oiseau du grenadier, Algerian tales, proverbs and childhood memories, Castor poche, Flammarion, Paris
1985: Le Galet et l'hirondelle, poems, L'Harmattan, Paris, 108 p. .
1986: Proverbes et dictons algériens, L'Harmattan
1987: Regard blessé, autobiographical novel, éditions Gallimard, Paris, Prix France Culture
1989: Jean Sénac: entre désir et douleur, essay, Office des Publications Universitaires
1989: L'Asile de pierre, novel, Gallimard, 152 p.
1991: L'Âne de Djeha, L'Harmattan
1992: Femmes sans visage, novel, Gallimard, (Prix Kateb Yacine), 141 p.
1993: Pierres d'équilibre, poems, Le Dé bleu
1994: Mémoire en archipel, collection of tales, Gallimard, 133 p.
1996: Chronique du temps de l'innocence, Gallimard
1998: Corps seul, poems, Gallimard, 70 p.

Anthologies 
Les Mots migrateurs, Une anthologie poétique algérienne, présentée par Tahar Djaout, Office des Publications Universitaires, Alger, 1984.
 Anthologie de la littérature algérienne (1950-1987), Introduction, choices, notices and comments by Charles Bonn, Le Livre de Poche, Paris, 1990 
 Des Chèvres noires dans un champ de neige ? 30 poètes et 4 peintres algériens, Bacchanales n°32, Saint-Martin-d'Hères, Maison de la poésie Rhône-Alpes - Paris, Marsa éditions, 2003 ; Des chèvres noires dans un champ de neige ? (Anthologie de la poésie algérienne contemporaine), édition enrichie, Bacchanales, n° 52, Saint-Martin-d'Hères, Maison de la poésie Rhône-Alpes, 2014  
 Ali El Hadj Tahar, Encyclopédie de la poésie algérienne de langue française, 1930-2008 (in two volumes), Algiers, Éditions Dalimen, 2009, 956 pages. 
 , Quand la nuit se brise (Poésie algérienne francophone contemporaine), éditions du Seuil, Paris, 2012.
Une anthologie des poésies arabes, images by Rachid Koraïchi, (poems chosen by Farouk Mardam-Bey  et Waciny Laredj, calligraphies d'Abdallah Akkar et Ghani Alani), Paris, Éditions Thierry Magnier, 2014 [poème: Les fenêtres sont vides...]

On Rabah Belamri 
 Christiane Chaulet Achour, « Belamri, Rabah », with the collaboration of Corinne Blanchaud (dir.), Dictionnaire des écrivains francophones classiques : Afrique subsaharienne, Caraïbe, Maghreb, Machrek, Océan Indien, H. Champion, Paris, 2010,  
 Jean Déjeux, Dictionnaire des auteurs maghrébins de langue française, Paris, Editions Karthala, 1984 .

See also 
Algerian literature

External links 
 Some books and collaborations by Rabah Belamri on the website of littératures du Maghreb Limag
 Deux poèmes de Rabah Belamri
 Article « Rabah Belamri ou la sérénité de la mémoire » sur Algérie-Focus
 Aerei, tale translated by Anna Albertano, TempOrali, n° 7, May 1991
 Giochi proibiti e madri in collera et Corano e desiderio, tales translated by  Anna Albertano, Linea d'Ombra, n° 116, Juin 1996

Algerian writers in French
20th-century Algerian poets
Berber people
University of Algiers alumni
Prix France Culture winners
1946 births
People from Sétif
1995 deaths
Algerian male poets
20th-century male writers